Sfatul Țării may refer to:

 Sfatul Țării, the National Assembly (parliament) of Bessarabia in 1917–1918 
 Sfatul Țării Palace 
 1917 Sfatul Țării election

Newspapers
 Sfatul Țării (newspaper, 1917–20), the newspaper of Sfatul Țării, 1917–1920 
 Sfatul Țării (newspaper), a newspaper of the Parliament of Moldova in the 1990s